Music City Mall may refer to:
Music City Mall (Lewisville, Texas), a mall in Lewisville, Texas, formerly known as Vista Ridge Mall
Music City Mall (Odessa, Texas), a mall in Odessa, Texas, formerly known as Permian Mall